Atar is the Zoroastrian concept for "burning and unburning fire" and "visible and invisible fire".

Atar may also refer to:

People
 Atar (name)

Places
 Atar, Mauritania, a city
 Atar Department, containing the city 
 Atar International Airport, serving the city 
 Atar, Padang Ganting, a village in Indonesia

Other uses
 ATAR, Australian Tertiary Admission Rank, for admission to Australian universities 
 Atelier Technique Aéronautique de Rickenbach, producer of jet engines:
 ATAR-23
 SNECMA Atar Volant
 SNECMA Atar, a French jet engine
 AT-AR, a type of Imperial Walker from the Star Wars fictional universe

See also
 Advanced Tactical Airborne Reconnaissance System (ATARS)
 Attar (disambiguation)